The Carroll Gardens Historic District is a small municipal and national historic district located in the Carroll Gardens neighborhood of Brooklyn, New York City. The national district consists of 134 contributing residential rowhouses built between the 1860s and 1880s. They are two- and three-story brownstone buildings in the neo-Grec and late Italianate styles located in a rectangle bounded by Carroll, President, Smith, and Hoyt Streets.  They feature uniform setbacks, even cornice lines and stoop levels, and fenced front yards and landscaped gardens.  These were the result of surveyor Richard Butt, who in 1846 planned gardens in front of the brownstone houses in the oldest section of the neighborhood. The homes are set farther back from the street than is common in Brooklyn, and the large gardens became an iconic depiction of the neighborhood. All the houses in the district, which is afforded a degree of privacy by the street pattern that discourages through traffic on Carroll and President Streets, were built between 1869 and 1884.

The district was designated a New York City landmark by the New York City Landmarks Preservation Commission in 1973, and was listed on the National Register of Historic Places in 1983.

See also
List of New York City Landmarks
National Register of Historic Places listings in New York County, New York

References

External links
 "Carroll Gardens Historic District"

Italianate architecture in New York City
1986 establishments in New York City
Carroll Gardens, Brooklyn
Historic districts on the National Register of Historic Places in Brooklyn
New York City designated historic districts
New York City Designated Landmarks in Brooklyn